Aldeburgh is a coastal town in the county of Suffolk, England. Located to the north of the River Alde. Its estimated population was 2,276 in 2019. It was home to the composer Benjamin Britten and remains the centre of the international Aldeburgh Festival of arts at nearby Snape Maltings, which was founded by Britten in 1948. It also hosts an annual poetry festival  and several food festivals and other events. Aldeburgh, as a port, gained borough status in 1529 under Henry VIII. Its historic buildings include a 16th-century moot hall and a Napoleonic-era Martello Tower. A third of its housing consists of second homes. Visitors are drawn to its Blue Flag beach and fisherman huts, where fresh fish is sold, to Aldeburgh Yacht Club and to its cultural offerings. Two family-run fish and chip shops have been rated among the country's best. The independent Aldeburgh bookshop has been in business for over seventy years, is locally thought to have been the site of the birthplace of George Crabbe (1754-1832)  and has  organised the annual Aldeburgh Literary Festival since 2002.

History

The name "Aldeburgh" derives from the Old English ald (old) and burh (fortification), although this structure, along with much of the Tudor town, has now been lost to the sea. In the 16th century, Aldeburgh was a leading port and had a flourishing shipbuilding industry. The flagship of the Virginia Company, the Sea Venture is believed to have been built here in 1608. Aldeburgh's importance as a port declined as the River Alde silted up and larger ships could no longer berth. It survived mainly on fishing until the 19th century, when it also became a seaside resort. Much of its distinctive, whimsical architecture dates from that period. The river is now home to a yacht club and a sailing club.

Between 1959 and 1968, the village was the location of a Royal Observer Corps monitoring bunker, to be used in the event of a nuclear attack. The bunker was later demolished, no trace survives today.

Geography

It lies just north of the River Alde, with the narrow shingle spit of Orford Ness all that stops the river meeting the sea at Aldeburgh – instead it flows another  to the south-west.

The beach is mainly shingle and wide in places, allowing fishing boats to draw up onto the beach above the high tide, but it narrows at the neck of Orford Ness. The shingle bank allows access to the Ness from the north, passing a Martello tower and two yacht clubs at the site of the former village of Slaughden. Aldeburgh was flooded in the North Sea flood of 1953, after which its flood defences were strengthened. The beach received a Blue Flag rural beach award in 2005.

The town is within the Suffolk Coast and Heaths Area of Outstanding Natural Beauty (AONB), with a number of Sites of Special Scientific Interest (SSSI) and nature reserves in its locality. The Alde-Ore Estuary SSSI covers the area surrounding the river from Snape to its mouth, including the whole of Orford Ness. This contains several salt marsh and mudflat habitats. The Leiston-Aldeburgh SSSI extends from the northern edge of the town over a range of habitats, including grazing marsh and heathland. It includes Thorpeness Mere and the North Warren RSPB reserve, an area of wildlife and habitat conservation, and nature trails run by the Royal Society for the Protection of Birds.

Two smaller geological SSSI units lie on the southern edges. Aldeburgh Hall Pit is a shallow pit  in area, featuring a section of Corralline Crag. It is seen as one of the best sites in Britain for Neogene fauna.

The town's churches include the pre-Reformation Anglican parish church of St Peter and St Paul and the Catholic Church of Our Lady and St Peter.

Governance

Aldeburgh has a town council and lies within the East Suffolk non-metropolitan district. Aldeburgh ward, including Thorpeness and other communities, had a population of 3225 in the 2011 census, when the mean age of the inhabitants was 55 and the median age 61.

It is within the Suffolk Coastal parliamentary constituency represented by Therese Coffey, having had John Gummer as the MP from 1979 to 2010. It is seen as a safe seat for the Conservatives.

Aldeburgh was a Parliamentary Borough from 1571, and returned two Members of Parliament (MPs), the right to vote being vested in the town's freemen. By the mid-18th century it was classed as a rotten borough, as the votes were controlled by a City of London merchant, Thomas Fonnereau: and memorably described it as "a venal little borough in Suffolk". It lost its representation under the Great Reform Act of 1832.

In 1908 Aldeburgh became the first British town to elect a female mayor: Elizabeth Garrett Anderson, whose father, Newson Garrett, had been mayor in 1889. In 2006, Sam Wright became Aldeburgh's town crier and mace bearer at 15, and so the youngest in the world.

Transport
Aldeburgh is linked to the A12 by the A1094 road, at Friday Street in Benhall. The B1122 leads to Leiston.

There are direct bus services from the town to Saxmundham and Halesworth. Passengers need to change at Leiston for onward services south-west to Woodbridge and Ipswich. Buses in the area are operated by First Norfolk & Suffolk and Borderbus.

Aldeburgh railway station opened in 1860 as the terminus of the Aldeburgh Branch Line from Saxmundham, but was closed in 1966 under the Beeching Axe. Saxmundham station hosts hourly weekday services to Ipswich, for connections towards London Liverpool Street, and to Lowestoft for Norwich.

Landmarks

Lifeboat station

The RNLI station in the town was operating two lifeboats in 2016.

Moot Hall

The Moot Hall is a Grade I listed timber-framed building, used for council meetings for over 400 years. The Town Clerk's office remains there and it houses the local museum. It was built in about 1520 and altered in 1654. The brick and stone infilling of the ground floor is later. The hall was restored and the external staircase and gable ends were rebuilt in 1854–1855 under the direction of R. M. Phipson, chief architect of the Diocese of Norwich, in which Aldeburgh then stood. There are 64 other listed historic buildings and monuments in the town.

Martello Tower

A unique quatrefoil Martello Tower stands at the isthmus leading to the Orford Ness shingle spit. It is the largest and northernmost of 103 English defensive towers built in 1808–1812 to resist a threatened Napoleonic invasion. The Landmark Trust now runs it as holiday apartments. From May 2015 to May 2016, an Antony Gormley statue was on display on the roof as part of his LAND art installation.

The Martello Tower is the only surviving building of the fishing village of Slaughden, which had been washed away by the North Sea by 1936. Near the Martello Tower at Slaughden Quay are barely visible remains of the fishing smack Ionia. It had become stuck in the treacherous mud of the River Alde, and was then used as a houseboat. In 1974 it was burnt, as it had become unsafe.

Fort Green Mill

The four-storey windmill at the southern end of the town was built in 1824 and converted into a dwelling in 1902.

WW2 tank trap
A WW2 tank trap can be seen next to Slaughden Road.

Aldeburgh Beach Lookout
The Aldeburgh Beach Lookout is a historic landmark on the Aldeburgh sea front. Grade II listed, it was built in about 1830 as a lookout tower to assist or plunder shipping along the hazardous North Sea coast. The South African writer Laurens van der Post did his writing there for over 30 years. Since 2010, the lookout has provided an artistic space for residents and tourists, with Antony Gormley sculptures on display between the lookout and the sea.

Scallop

On Aldeburgh's beach, a short distance north of the town centre, stands a sculpture called Scallop, dedicated to Benjamin Britten, who would walk along the beach in the afternoons. The piece is made up of two interlocking scallop shells, each broken, the upright shell being pierced by the words, "I hear those voices that will not be drowned," taken from Britten's opera Peter Grimes. The sculpture is meant to be enjoyed both visually and in a tactile way: people are encouraged to sit on it and watch the sea.

The upright portion of the shell splits into three sections positioned at different angles. The positioning of these effects a visual transformation, depending on the vantage point from which the sculpture is viewed.

The sculpture is controversial in the local area, with some local residents considering it spoils the beach. It has been vandalised with graffiti and paint on 13 occasions. There have been petitions for its removal and for its retention.

First World War
A nearby aerodrome, Royal Naval Air Station Aldeburgh, was used in the First World War as a Night Landing Ground and for training observers.

Notable residents

Henry Johnson (c. 1659–1719), "greatest shipbuilder and shipowner of his day" and MP for Aldeburgh, 1689–1719
George Crabbe (1754–1832), poet, was born in Aldeburgh, which features in his poems The Village and The Borough. The latter concerns a fisherman named Peter Grimes, on whose story Benjamin Britten's opera of that name was based.
John Liptrot Hatton (1809–1886) was an internationally celebrated English composer, conductor, pianist and singer who stayed in Aldeburgh for some time and wrote, for the place he loved, an Aldeburgh Te Deum.
Elizabeth Garrett Anderson (1836–1917) was the first woman to qualify as a physician and surgeon in Britain, co-founder of first hospital staffed by women, first female dean of a British medical school, first female doctor of medicine in France, first woman in Britain elected to a school board, and as Mayor of Aldeburgh, first female mayor and magistrate in Britain.
Annie Hall Cudlip, (1838–1918) writer, novelist and short story writer, was born in Aldeburgh.
Agnes Garrett (1845–1935), suffragist and interior designer, founded the Ladies Dwellings Company.
Dame Millicent Fawcett (1847–1929), suffragist, feminist and writer, was born in Aldeburgh, where she set her one novel, Janet Doncaster.
M. R. James (1862–1936), author, set a story, "A Warning to the Curious", in "Seaburgh" (Aldeburgh). Landmarks such as the Martello tower and White Lion Hotel feature.
Joan Cross (1900–1993), soprano and theatre director who created several Britten opera roles, is buried in the town churchyard.
Gerry Fiennes (1906–1985), railway manager and author, was Mayor of Aldeburgh in 1976.
Imogen Holst (1907-1984), composer, conductor, teacher, assistant to Benjamin Britten, and co-director of the Aldeburgh Festival from 1956 to 1977, lived in Aldeburgh from 1952.
H. T. Cadbury-Brown (1913–2009), architect.
Benjamin Britten (1913–1976) moved to the town in 1942. He, Eric Crozier (1914–1994) and Peter Pears (1910–1986) founded the Aldeburgh Festival and Aldeburgh Music Club. He moved with Pears into The Red House in 1957. They lie side by side in the town churchyard.
Ian Tait (1926–2013) was a GP in Aldeburgh (from 1959) and one of the founders of the Aldeburgh Poetry Festival; he is known for his work in the modernisation of general practice.
Ruth Rendell (1930–2015), author of thrillers and psychological murder mysteries, created Chief Inspector Wexford.
Rt Revd Sandy Millar (born 1939), once Vicar of Holy Trinity Brompton and co-founder of the Alpha course, lives in Aldeburgh.
Francis Carnwath CBE (1940–2020), deputy director of the Tate gallery 1990–1994, and co-founder of the Aldeburgh Beach Lookout.
Sue Lloyd (1939–2011), model and actress, played Barbara Hunter in Crossroads.
Christine Truman (born 1941), Grand Slam tennis event winner, lives in Aldeburgh.
Malcolm Bowie (1943–2007), Master of Christ's College, Cambridge, 2002–2006.
Peter Sinfield (born 1943), songwriter with the progressive rock act King Crimson, lives in Aldeburgh.
Cevanne Horrocks-Hopayian (living), composer, was born in the area and lives in Aldeburgh, on the border with Thorpeness.
Roy Keane (born 1971), footballer, became an Aldeburgh resident in 2009 on taking over as manager of Ipswich Town.
Miranda Raison (born 1977), actress, has a weekend cottage in Aldeburgh and belongs to Aldeburgh Golf Club.
Isabella Summers (born 1980), songwriter, producer and remixer (Florence and the Machine), is an Aldeburgh native.

Culture

Outside the town, the Snape Maltings is the venue for the Aldeburgh Festival held every June.

Aldeburgh Music Club, founded by Benjamin Britten and Peter Pears in 1952, has since evolved into one of East Anglia's leading choirs, with about 100 members and over 120 supporting patrons. It rehearses from early September to late May each year and holds three major performances, two of them at Snape Maltings Concert Hall.

The annual Aldeburgh Carnival in August has been held at least since 1892 and possibly since 1832, when "Ye Olde Marine Regatta" was mentioned. The focal point today is a Carnival Procession featuring locals and visitors dressed in home-made costumes and on floats, often with a topical or local theme. In the evening, a parade with Chinese lanterns and a firework display are traditional. The procession has been led for over 30 years by Chief Marshal Trevor Harvey, also a Carnival Committee member for over 50 years.

The Suffolk Craft Society hold an annual themed exhibition in the Peter Pears Gallery over July and August, showing the work of its members.

The town of Aldeburgh or "Owlbarrow" is the setting of a series of children's illustrated books centred on Orlando (The Marmalade Cat) written by Kathleen Hale, who spent holidays in the town. Many illustrations in the books feature landmarks in the town, including the Moot Hall. The town features in the thriller Cross of Fire by novelist Colin Forbes, as do the nearby villages of Dunwich and Snape Maltings. James Herbert based his book The Jonah in the area, using several names represented in the local area for characters, including Slaughden.

Aldeburgh (spelt there Aldborough) is the location of a key scene in Wilkie Collins's novel No Name, where Captain Wragge and Magdalen Vanstone enact their conspiracy against Noel Vanstone and Mrs Lecount. The town's Martello Tower is mentioned as a landmark. Aldeburgh also features in Joseph Freeman's novel Arcadia Lodge as "Seaburgh", and in the M. R. James story "A Warning To The Curious". The Maggi Hambling sculpture appears in an early scene, as do various other landmarks.

Fishing
Aldeburgh is notable for its line fishing for amateur anglers; it has been called "a great spot for bass, flounders, sole, dabs, cod, whiting and eels". However, the East Anglian Daily Times says "countless years of commercial over-fishing has all but destroyed many of our [Suffolk's] offshore sea fisheries" and traditional, sustainable inshore fishing is under threat, with likely knock-on effects for the coastal community. Local fishermen featured in the "Fish Fight" campaigns of Hugh Fearnley-Whittingstall and Greenpeace, supporting small-scale inshore fishermen.

Rugby
Aldeburgh is home to Aldeburgh and Thorpeness Rugby Club, based at Kings Field in Aldeburgh. The club runs an adult team in the Eastern Counties Leagues, an Under 15s team, Midi/Mini rugby, and Women's touch rugby. The club started out in nearby Thorpeness and moved in 2015 to work with Aldeburgh Town Council and Aldeburgh Community Centre.

Other amenities
These include Aldeburgh Cottage Hospital, a traditional English cottage hospital, the Aldeburgh Library, which also relies on volunteers, and the Aldeburgh Cinema, which puts on films and cultural events.

Arms

References

Norman Scarfe: The Shell Guide to Suffolk, 1976
Kate Pugh: Return to Suffolk, 2007 Crabbe 1792–1805. Bottesford Living History Community Heritage Project on the poet George Crabbe
Ray Sturtivant and Gordon Page:  Royal Navy Aircraft Serials and Units 1911–1919, Air-Britain, 1992,

External links

The Aldeburgh Museum
Aldeburgh Past

 
Towns in Suffolk
Seaside resorts in England
Benjamin Britten
Beaches of Suffolk
Civil parishes in Suffolk